Greta Van Fleet is an American hard rock band. The band released their debut studio EP, Black Smoke Rising in 2017. Their debut single, "Highway Tune", topped the Billboard US Mainstream Rock and Active Rock charts in September 2017 for four weeks in a row. A second EP running at 32 minutes From the Fires, containing the four songs from Black Smoke Rising and four new songs, was released on November 10, 2017, alongside a second single, "Safari Song". Their debut full length studio album running at 49 minutes, Anthem of the Peaceful Army, was released on October 19, 2018 and it topped the Billboard Rock Albums chart in the first week after its release,  with the album's first single, "When the Curtain Falls", being released ahead of it in July 2018, and eventually becoming the band's third number one US single on the Billboard Mainstream Rock Songs chart. Anthem of the Peaceful Army also launched atop the Billboard Hard Rock Albums chart, and reached the number one spot on the Billboard Top Album Sales chart in the first week after its release. The 64 minute album, The Battle at Garden's Gate was released on October 9, 2020 with their singles "Heat Above", "Light my Love", and "My Way, Soon". It debuted at number 8 on the Billboard 200 chart.

Studio albums

Extended plays

Live albums

Singles

Other charted songs

Music videos

Notes

References

Discographies of American artists
Rock music group discographies